(Enemies, blow the alarm), BWV 205.2 (formerly BWV 205a), is a secular cantata composed by Johann Sebastian Bach.

The cantata was intended for the coronation of Augustus III as King of Poland and was first performed on 19 February 1734. The music for the work is lost. The eighth, twelfth and fourteenth movements were newly composed recitatives, while the other movements Bach derived from BWV 205.

It is counted among the works Bach wrote for celebrations of the Leipzig University, Festmusiken zu Leipziger Universitätsfeiern.

References 

Secular cantatas by Johann Sebastian Bach